The following is a summary of the  2008  season by Paraguayan football (soccer) club Olimpia Asunción.

Olimpia participated in the following competitions in 2008: Torneo Apertura and Torneo Clausura (pertaining to the Paraguayan first division) and the Copa Sudamericana. In December, Eduardo Delmás was elected as the club's new president replacing Oscar Paciello.

Torneo Apertura 2008

Olimpia started the year 2008 with the announcement of a new coach, Argentine Gustavo Costas who promised the use and promotion of the youth division players. The main signing for the year was that of Paraguayan international Carlos Humberto Paredes from Sporting Lisboa. Paredes returned to his home club Olimpia after playing for 8 years in Europe.

Team roster

Coach: Gustavo Costas

Final standing

Results

Top scorers
Top scorers for Olimpia in the Apertura tournament:

Hellboy

Torneo Clausura 2008

For the Clausura tournament the club hired the requested players by coach Gustavo Costas to fight for the title. However, poor performances and results both in the Paraguayan first division and Copa Sudamericana tournament resulted in the resignation of the Argentine coach on August 28. On the next day, Paraguayan Ever Hugo Almeida was chosen as the new coach of Olimpia, marking his return to the club since the 1993 season where he won the first division title in undefeated fashion.

Transfers
The following transfers occurred prior to the start of the Clausura tournament:

In:
  Denis Caniza From  Cruz Azul
  Jose Ramirez From  Olimpo
  Franco Mendoza From  C.A. Huracán
  Edgar Daniel González From  Estudiantes LP
  Juan Manuel Lucero  From  CD Cobresal
  Cristian Leiva  From  Charleroi SC
  Derlis Cardozo  From  Club Libertad
  Ever Caballero  From  12 de Octubre
  Marco Lazaga From  Sportivo Luqueño
  Darío Caballero From  Deportivo Quito
  Matías Espíndola  From  Sportivo Patria

Out:
  Angel Ortiz To  Club Guaraní
  Gilberto Palacios To  Club Guaraní
  David Villalba To  Deportes Tolima
  Emanuel Fernandes To  Vélez Sársfield
  Rolando Renaut  To  12 de Octubre
  Leonardo Bordad To  Sol de America
  Ricardo Dominguez To  Cruz Azul Hidalgo
  Michel Godoy  To  3 de Febrero
  Rodrigo Romero To  3 de Febrero
  Milton Benítez To  3 de Febrero
  Mauro Monges Retired 
  Juvenal Cardozo To  Guabirá 
  Martín García To  Defensor Sporting

Team roster

Last Updated: August, 2008. * Players List

Final standing

Last Updated: December, 2008 *League Stats

Results

Top scorers
Top scorers for Olimpia in the Clausura tournament.

Last Updated:December 24, 2008

International competition(s)

Copa Sudamericana 2008

Preliminary Round

First Round(eliminated)

References

See also
 2007 Club Olimpia season
 2009 Club Olimpia season

2008
Olimpia